Bibiana Martina Olama Mangue (born 2 December 1982, in Equatorial Guinea) is an Equatorial Guinean athlete. She competed at the 2012 Summer Olympics in the 100 metres hurdles event. She was flag bearer for the Equatorial Guinea team. She also competed in heptathlons.

References 

1982 births
Living people
Equatoguinean female hurdlers
Equatoguinean female sprinters
Olympic athletes of Equatorial Guinea
Athletes (track and field) at the 2012 Summer Olympics